Theodore "Ted" Dumitru (born Dumitru Teodorescu; 2 September 1939 – 26 May 2016) was a Romanian football manager who is best known for his time in South Africa. Dumitru was one of few coaches who have led South Africa's 'big three' clubs Kaizer Chiefs, Mamelodi Sundowns and Orlando Pirates.

Dumitru was brought to South Africa by the owner of Kaizer Chiefs, Kaizer Motaung, in 1985, Dumitru went on to become the most successful coach in South African professional football. The veteran coach had an illustrious career during which he amassed 18 trophies with Chiefs and Sundowns, including two back-to-back league championships with each side.

Career

Early coaching career in Romania and Turkey
Dumitru started playing football with local side Sportul Studenţesc in the late 1950s, but a serious knee injury forced him to hang up his boots, as a result he began studying to become a coach. After obtaining his coaching license, Dumitru became the youngest manager ever in Divizia A at age 25, when he joined Ştiinţa Craiova, currently known as Universitatea Craiova, in the middle of the 1965–66 season with whom he finished the season on the eighth position. Dumitru also coached the Romania U23 Olympic team between 1967 and 1968.

In 1969, he went to Turkey where he managed Altay Izmir, Beşiktaş and then Mersin. In his first season in charge at Altay he guided the club to a top-three position in the Turkish Süper League.

Move to the United States and final destination Africa 
In 1971, Dumitru moved to the United States and became head coach of the Texas Longhorns men's soccer team at the University of Texas, before joining Rochester Lancers in the North American Soccer League in 1974. He coached that side through the 1975 season and went on to coach the New York Apollo in the old American Soccer League.

In 1980, Dumitru moved to Africa and was appointed coach of the Zambia national team. He helped Chipolopolo qualify for the 1982 Africa Cup of Nations, but was unable to coach them during the tournament itself due to his US passport. The Afcon tournament was hosted by Libya, a country where Americans were not welcome at the time. During his stint Zambia's President Kenneth Kaunda once said of him: "He is more than a coach; he is a son of Africa. He is a humanist who puts sports well-being ahead of his profession."

He left Zambia and signed a contract with the African Football Confederation, in which he was sent to Swaziland, then in Namibia, to help develop football in those countries.

In 1985, Dumitru joined South African side Kaizer Chiefs and won eight trophies with them during his three-year tenure. After leaving the club he worked in developing young players and local coaches across the country.

In 1992, he established the Chibuku Youth Centre in Soweto, which was the first development program in the country. He was later responsible for the Esselen Park School of Excellence that has produced players such as Steven Pienaar and Daine Klate.

In July 1997, he took over as coach at Mamelodi Sundowns and led The Brazilians to two consecutive PSL titles in 1998 and 1999, as well as both the Nedbank Cup and Rothmans Cup. Dumitru managed among others, Orlando Pirates and Manning Rangers with mixed success. He was appointed manager of the Namibia national team in November 2000 replacing Lucky Richter, but resigned a few months later after an argument with former Chiefs midfielder, Robert Nauseb.

He rejoined Mamelodi Sundowns and helped his side reach their first and only African Champions League Final in 2001, which they lost to record holders Al Ahly.

In June 2003, he returned to Kaiser Chiefs and won back-to-back league titles in 2004 and 2005, after which he retired from club coaching. In South Africa, Dumitru was nicknamed "Master Ted", "Mr Magic" or "The Professor", because of his studious approach to the game.

In November 2005, he was hired as South Africa's manager ahead of the 2006 edition of the Africa Cup of Nations, but he was shown the exit door soon after his team's dismissal performance at the tournament where they failed to score a goal.

In 2009, Dumitru got involved with the Mamelodi Sundowns Youth Academy. Dubbed "The Puk Tawana Project", it produced 26 players who went on to play professional football that were on an accelerated development programme for 18 months. Breaking records for the number of graduates from academy to professional level. Among them included Keagan Dolly, Buhle Mkhwanazi, Samuel Julies and Jabulani Shongwe. After leaving Mamelodi Sundowns in 2011, he joined the North West University Sports Institute from 2012 to 2013 briefly. Then in 2013 he played an instrumental role in the revival of the South African Football Coaches Association (SAFCA). He played a key role in setting up the structures, giving the organisation direction and leadership as well as rolling out workshops around the country. He was involved up until his day of passing 26 May 2016.

Over 150 players were developed at the Sport School of Excellence under his guidance and through his coaching solutions. Over 180 local coaches were developed through his programmes at the SA Soccer Academy.

Death 
Dumitru died on 26 May 2016, at the age of 76, after suffering a heart attack in a Johannesburg mall. A memorial service for the late coach was held on 2 June at Ellis Park Arena in Johannesburg.

Honours

Manager
Kaizer Chiefs
 PSL Champion: 2003–04, 2004–05
 Vodacom Challenge: 2003
 BP Top Eight Cup: 1985, 1987
 Coca-Cola Cup: 1986, 1988, 2003, 2004
 Mainstay Cup: 1987
 Charity Spectacular Cup: 1986, 1987, 1988, 2003
 NSL runner-up: 1987

Mamelodi Sundowns
 PSL Champion: 1997–98, 1998–99
 Nedbank Cup: 1998
 Rothmans Cup: 1999
 CAF Champions League runner-up: 2001

Orlando Pirates
 African Cup Winners' Cup semi-final: 1999

References

Further reading
 Dumitru, Theodore. Maximal Training. Tafelberg Publishers Ltd, 2005. .

1939 births
2016 deaths
Romanian footballers
Romanian football managers
Romanian expatriate football managers
Sportspeople from Bucharest
Expatriate football managers in Namibia
Namibia national football team managers
Expatriate football managers in Eswatini
Eswatini national football team managers
Expatriate soccer managers in South Africa
South Africa national soccer team managers
Expatriate football managers in Zambia
Zambia national football team managers
Expatriate soccer managers in the United States
North American Soccer League (1968–1984) coaches
American Soccer League (1933–1983) coaches
Expatriate football managers in Turkey
Altay S.K. managers
Beşiktaş J.K. managers
Mersin İdman Yurdu managers
Orlando Pirates F.C. managers
Mamelodi Sundowns F.C. managers
Kaizer Chiefs F.C. managers
CS Universitatea Craiova managers
Romanian defectors
Romanian expatriate sportspeople in Turkey
Romanian expatriate sportspeople in the United States
Romanian expatriate sportspeople in South Africa
2006 Africa Cup of Nations managers
1982 African Cup of Nations managers
Association footballers not categorized by position